At the 1984 Summer Olympics in Los Angeles, four diving events (2 for men and 2 for women) were contested during a competition that took place at the Olympic Swim Stadium of the University of Southern California (USC), from 5 to 12 August, comprising 80 divers from 29 nations.

Medal summary
The events are named according to the International Olympic Committee labelling, but they appeared on the official report as "springboard diving" and "platform diving", respectively.

Men

Women

Medal table

Participating nations
Here are listed the nations that were represented in the diving events and, in brackets, the number of national competitors.

See also
 Diving at the 1983 Pan American Games
 Diving at the Friendship Games

Notes

References
 
 

 
1984 Summer Olympics events
1984
1984 in water sports
International aquatics competitions hosted by the United States